Logan Giulietti-Schmitt (born August 16, 1985) is an American former competitive ice dancer. With partner Lynn Kriengkrairut, he is a two-time (2011–2012) Ice Challenge champion and the 2012 U.S. national pewter medalist.

Career 
Giulietti-Schmitt began learning to skate at age three and a half. He competed in single skating until 2004, when he sustained a stress fracture in his lower back. Having started ice dancing in 1999, he competed with Caitlin Morocco on the intermediate level and with Mauri Gustafson on the junior level. His partnership with Gustafson came to an end in late June 2006, leaving him with little time to find a new partner for the next season. 

Giulietti-Schmitt contacted Lynn Kriengkrairut after seeing her on IcePartnerSearch. They began skating together in July 2006, agreeing to form a partnership on the second day of a planned three-day tryout. The two were coached by Yuri Chesnichenko and Yaroslava Nechaeva from the start of their partnership. They won the junior bronze medal at the 2007 U.S. Championships in their first season together.

Kriengkrairut/Giulietti-Schmitt received a host invitation to compete at 2010 Skate America where they finished 6th. At the 2011 U.S. Championships, they were in fourth after the short dance but dropped to fifth overall after a fall at the end of their free dance.

At the 2012 U.S. Championships, Kriengkrairut/Giulietti-Schmitt placed fourth in both segments and won the pewter medal. The following season, they were fifth at the 2013 U.S. Championships. They changed coaches in February 2013, joining Igor Shpilband in Novi, Michigan. Kriengkrairut sustained a concussion in late June 2013. The two decided to retire from competition on April 24, 2014.

Giulietti-Schmitt was the director of the Learn To Skate program at Ann Arbor Skating Club August 2008 thru August 2014.

Personal life 
In December 2008, Giulietti-Schmitt earned a Bachelor's degree in geology from Eastern Michigan University.

Programs 
(with Kriengkrairut)

Competitive highlights

With Kriengkrairut

With Gustafson

References

External links 

 
 Lynn Kriengkrairut / Logan Giulietti-Schmitt at IceNetwork
 Official site
 

1985 births
Living people
American male ice dancers
Figure skaters from Chicago